Tim Spencer (born 3 June 1943) is an Australian figure skater. He competed in the men's singles event at the 1960 Winter Olympics.

References

External links
 

1943 births
Living people
Australian male single skaters
Olympic figure skaters of Australia
Figure skaters at the 1960 Winter Olympics
Place of birth missing (living people)